MFF may refer to:

Football
 Malmö FF, a Swedish football club
 Mongolian Football Federation, governs football in Mongolia
 Myanmar Football Federation, governs football in Myanmar

Science and technology
 MAC-Forced Forwarding (also known as MACFF), a networking technology
 Molecular Frontiers Foundation, a non-profit chemistry organization
 MFF (gene), encodes the protein mitochondrial fission factor
 MFF SIM, SIM cards for machine use

Other meanings
 Maryland Film Festival, Baltimore, United States 
 Midwest FurFest, a furry convention in Chicago
 Minffordd railway station, Wales (station code)
 Minnesota Freedom Fund, a non-profit for bail fund
 Military Freefall Parachutist Badge, a badge of the U.S. Army
 Multiannual Financial Framework, a budget plan of the European Union
 Male-female-female, a threesome with one male and two females